Hank is a village in the Dutch province of North Brabant. Hanks borders on De Biesbosch National Park.

It was first mentioned in 1851 as De Hank, and means "place where fishers dry their nets".

The area was poldered in 1188 and a little village called Heeraartswaarde and church were built, however the settlement was destroyed in the St. Elizabeth's flood of 1421. In 1863, a Catholic parish was founded as Mariapolder, and in 1896 a convent of the Sisters of Charity was established near the village. The village was almost entirely destroyed in 1944 during World War II. Hank was rebuilt after the war.

Gallery

References

Populated places in North Brabant
Geography of Altena, North Brabant